Buzdar is a clan of Baloch tribe Rind, living in Balochistan, Sindh and Punjab provinces of Pakistan.
They mostly live in Koh Suleiman.
The population of Buzdar tribe 900,000 people. Sardar Usman Buzdar is current  Tumandar  of Buzdar tribe.

History
Buzdar is a clan of Rind tribe, and usually associated with the mountainous districts of the frontier near Dera Ghazi Khan. They are also to be found in Zhob, Thal-Chotiali and Las Bela, while the majority of the population live in the Punjab province. They are usually ranchers, and the name Bozdar is probably derived from Buz, the Persian name for goat. 

Within the limits of their mountainous home, on the outer spurs of the Sulaiman Mountains, they have always been a martial tribe and they were formerly constantly feuding with the neighboring Ustarana and Sherani tribes.

In 1857, their raids into the Punjab drew upon them a punitive expedition under Brigadier-General Sir N. B. Chamberlain. The Sangarh pass was captured and the Buzdars submitted.

Notable people
 Sardar Fateh Buzdar, former member of Punjab Assembly
 Sardar Usman Buzdar, Former Chief Minister of Punjab

See also
 Dhaghano Bozdar

References 

Social groups of Pakistan
Sindhi tribes
Baloch tribes